Pagnacco is a comune (municipality) in the Province of Udine in the Italian region Friuli-Venezia Giulia, located about  northwest of Trieste and about  northwest of Udine.

The municipality of Pagnacco contains the frazioni (subdivisions, mainly villages and hamlets) Castellerio, Fontanabona, Lazzacco, Modoletto, Plaino, and Zampis.

Pagnacco borders the following municipalities: Colloredo di Monte Albano, Martignacco, Moruzzo, Tavagnacco, Tricesimo.

Demographic evolution

Twin towns
Pagnacco is twinned with:

  Celldömölk, Hungary

References

External links
 www.comune.pagnacco.ud.it/

Cities and towns in Friuli-Venezia Giulia